Felimare malacitana is a species of colourful sea slug or dorid nudibranch, a marine gastropod mollusk in the family Chromodorididae.

Distribution
This nudibranch is known only from the Mediterranean near Spain.

Description
Felimare malacitana has a dark blue-black body and is covered in yellow specks. The mantle edge has bands of blue-yellow-black-yellow-blues lines. The gills and rhinophores are opaque light-blue lined with fine yellow.

This species can reach a total length of at least .

References

Chromodorididae
Gastropods described in 1986